The Institut des hautes études en arts plastiques (IHEAP) is a post-graduate art school based in Paris for research and experimentation in art.

History

IHEAP 1985–1995 
In 1985, the City of Paris commissioned Pontus Hulten to design a graduate school for research in contemporary art, similar in spirit to the Bauhaus and Black Mountain College in the U.S., to function as an alternative to the École nationale supérieure des beaux-arts. Hulten conceived of the Institut as a center for contemporary research in artistic creation. The Institute operated from 1988 to 1995.

IHEAP 2012
In 2012, the Biennale de Paris open a new Institut des hautes études en arts plastiques (IHEAP), according to its own viewpoints while also reactivating those of earlier institutions. Drawing on the original model, the new IHEAP kept its name, intentions, idea of a simple structure, necessity of transversality and discussion, and its international dimension.

Buren Lawsuit
In March 2015, the French artist Daniel Buren, one of the professors in the original IHEAP, filed suit in the High Court of Paris against the newer IHEAP organization founded in 2012. In an open letter published on his web site, Buren claims that the 2012 IHEAP improperly usurped the name and reputation of the original IHEAP.

Session 2012–2014 
Work topics:
 "The Invisual"
 "The Exhibition: A Compromise"
 "A History of Art Through the Dematerialisation of the Art Object"
 "Art Out of Art"
 "The Splendor and Misery of The Art Object"
 "How can The Art Object be a Problem?"
 "What is The Public of Indifference?"
 "Imagine the Cultural Action of the Decades 2020-2050″
 "Parallel Economies of Art"
 "Basic Notions of Disobedience"
 "Horizontal Institution"
 "The Norm of Art"
 "What is The Terminology of Art? New Words for Existing Realities"
 "Introduction of The Notion of Strategy in Art"
 "To Be Thought By Art"
 "To Think Art"

Professors and lecturers since 1985 

 Abdel Kebir Khatibi, artist
 Afrika, artist
 Giovanni Anselmo, artist
 Jean-Michel Arnold, director of the CNRS
 Michael Asher, artist
 Bernard Baissait, designer
 Robert Barry, artist
 Pr. Étienne-Émile Baulieu, biochemist
 Aurélie Bousquet, artist
 Rose-Marie Barrientos, art historian, critic
 Mikaîl Bode, art critic
 Robert Bordaz, State Councilor, attorney
 Ida Biard, gallery owner
 Patrick Bouchain, builder
 Benjamin Buchloh, art historian
 Daniel Buren, artist
 Germano Celant, art critic
 Jean-François Chevrier, art historian, critic
 Michel Chion, composer, essayist
 Michel Claura, attorney, art critic
 Gilles Clément, landscape
 Bruno Cora, art critic
 Jacqueline Dauriac, artist
 Loïc Depecker, terminologist, linguist
 Pierre Descargues, journalist
 Jean Douchet, cinema critic
 Éric Duyckaerts, artist
 Guillaume du Boisbaudry, philosopher
 Éric Fabre, gallery owner
 Luciano Fabro, artist
 Jean-Baptiste Farkas, operate under Glitch
 Serge Fauchereau, writer, art historian
 Peter Fend, artist
 Dan Graham, artist
 Niki de Saint Phalle, artist
 Jérôme de Noiremont, gallery owner
 Hans Haacke, artist
 Jürgen Harten, museographer
 Danièle Huillet, film director
 Pontus Hulten, museographer
 Ilya Kabakov, artist
 Nelly Kaplan, film director
 Caroline Keppi, artist
 Pr. Dr. David Klatzmann, biologist
 Komar et Melamid, artist
 Jannis Kounellis, artist
 Robert Kramer, film director
 Claes Oldenburg, artist
 Bertrand Lavier, artist
 Jean Le Gac, artist
 Gérard Legrand, cinematic essayist
 Marine Legrand, researcher
 André Éric Létourneau, artist manoevrer
 Jean-François Lyotard, philosopher
 Giulio Macchi, curator
 Philippe Mairesse, operate under Local Acces
 Jean-Hubert Martin, museographer
 Francesco Masci, philosopher
 Michael Mc Clure, writer
 Yves Michaud, philosopher
 Ghislain Mollet-Viéville, agent of art
 Pierre Monjaret, artist
 Matt Mullican, artist
 Jean-Louis Maubant, museographer
 Valeri Naoumov, film director
 Michel Nuridsany, journalist, art critic
 Jean Nouvel, architect
 Giuseppe Panza di Biumo, collector
 Renzo Piano, architect
 Huang Yong Ping, artist
 Clovis Prévost, film director
 Anna Ptakowska, gallery owner
 André Raffray, artist
 Jean-Pierre Raynaud, artist
 Roland Recht, museographer
 Hubert Renard, artist
 Denys Riout, art historian
 Paul Robert, runer artist
 Christian Ruby, philosopher
 Raoul Ruiz, film director
 Edward Rusha, artist
 Sarkis, artist
 Jean-Noël Schifano, journalist, writer
 Monique Sicard, researcerh at CNRS
 Thomas Shannon, artist
 Sylvain Soussan, operate under clouds museum
 Pietro Spartà, gallery owner
 Robert Storr, critic, writer
 Jean-Marie Straub, film director
 Harald Szeemann, museographer, curator
 Daniel Templon, gallery owner
 Jean-Claude Terrasson, essayist
 Jean Tinguely, artist
 Andrej Tisma, artist
 Coosje Van Bruggen, artist
 Liliane Viala, artist
 Lawrence Weiner, artist
 Yang Jiechang, artist
 Jean-Claude Zylberstein, attorney

Notable alumni 

 Delphine Coindet, artist
 Dominique Gonzalez-Foerster
 Pierre Huyghe, artist
 Mathieu Mercier, artist
 Philippe Parreno, artist
 Xavier Veilhan, artist

Notes

External links 
  Iheap website

Art schools in Paris
Postgraduate schools in France